A.C. Milan had a troubled season, with the president Farina going in exile to South Africa, suspected for stealing money from the club. At the end of the season Silvio Berlusconi bought the club, bringing it into a new era that was to be the most successful one in Italian footballing history.

On the pitch, Milan finished 7th in the national championship, having severe problems with the goalscoring.

Squad

Goalkeepers
  Giulio Nuciari
  Fabrizio Ferron
  Giuliano Terraneo
  Antonio Vettore

Defenders
  Franco Baresi
  Alessandro Costacurta
  Filippo Galli
  Roberto Lorenzini
  Paolo Maldini
  Carmelo Mancuso
  Luigi Russo
  Mauro Tassotti

Midfielders
  Mario Bortolazzi
  Gabriello Carotti
  Agostino Di Bartolomei
  Alfonso Di Marco
  Alberigo Evani
  Andrea Icardi
  Marco Macina
  Andrea Manzo
  Ray Wilkins

Attackers
  Mark Hateley
  Paolo Rossi
  Pietro Paolo Virdis
  Valentino Spelta

Competitions

Serie A

League table

Matches

Top scorers
  Mark Hateley 8
  Pietro Paolo Virdis 6
  Agostino Di Bartolomei 2
  Filippo Galli 2
  Paolo Rossi 2

Coppa Italia 

First round Group 6

Round of 16

UEFA Cup 

First Round

Second Round

Round of 16

References

Sources
  RSSSF - Italy 1985/86

A.C. Milan seasons
Milan